Županovice is a municipality and village in Příbram District in the Central Bohemian Region of the Czech Republic. It has about 70 inhabitants.

Geography

It lies in the Benešov Uplands. The municipality is situated on the shore of the Slapy Reservoir.

History
The first written mention of Županovice is from 1235, when Constance of Hungary donated the village to her daughter Agnes of Bohemia. Agnes bequeathed Županovice to the Knights of the Cross with the Red Star at St. Francis in Prague. They built a hospital here and remained the owners of the village until serfdom was abolished in 1848.

During the construction of the Slapy Reservoir in 1954, most of the historical part of the village was demolished and mostly new family houses remained.

Economy
Županovice is known as a recreational area. There are approximately 200 of recreational facilities, cottage hamlets and campsites.

References

External links

Villages in Příbram District